The 1908 United States elections elected the members of the 61st United States Congress, occurring during the Fourth Party System. Oklahoma joined the union during the 61st Congress. Despite the Panic of 1907, Republicans continued to control the Presidency and both houses of Congress.

In the Presidential election, Republican former Secretary of War William Howard Taft defeated Democratic former Representative William Jennings Bryan of Nebraska. Taft and Bryan won both of their respective parties' nominations on the first ballot. Taft easily won the election, taking most states outside the South. Bryan's loss made him the only presidential nominee of a major party to lose three general elections.

Democrats made minor gains in the House, but Republicans maintained a solid majority in the chamber. 

In the Senate, Democrats picked up one seat, but Republicans continued to hold a commanding majority.

See also
1908 United States presidential election
1908 United States House of Representatives elections
1908–09 United States Senate elections
1908 United States gubernatorial elections

References

1908 elections in the United States
1908